The Alaçatı Dam is a dam in İzmir Province, Turkey, built between 1994 and 1997.

See also
List of dams and reservoirs in Turkey

External links
Devlet Su İşleri Genel Müdürlüğü Baraj Detay Sayfası (in Turkish)

Dams in İzmir Province
Dams completed in 1997